Bò kho is a dish of South Vietnamese origin using the kho cooking method, it is a spicy dish made commonly with beef which is known throughout the country and beyond. In rural areas, the dish is described as being "extremely fiery." There are variants of the dish that is made with chicken, known as gà kho, or gà kho gừng (gừng meaning "ginger") and also made with fish, known as cá kho.

Origin 
The taste of the dish is not in the typical Vietnamese style and is more reminiscent of Indian or Malaysian cuisine. The wide distribution of beef and slow-cooked stews in Vietnam are thanks to French culinary influence during colonial times, so the modern dish is considered to have a mixed origin.

Cooking 

Мodern Vietnamese cooks cook bò kho using metal saucepans, but originally it was made by simmering the broth in clay pots.

The ingredients of the dish can vary widely. The typical ingredients of the dish are beef, carrot, lemongrass, and garlic. Some other ingredients that can be used are tomatoes, applesauce, and star anise, and galangal. The ingredients are first marinated with some Vietnamese spices and sauces (ginger, chili, Vietnamese-style fish sauce). An off-the-shelf bò kho powder is also available. Then, the dish should be slowly stewed until cooked.

It is usually served with rice, rice noodles, or baguette, and herbs (examples include Thai basil, and cilantro).

See also 
 Gà kho
 Cá kho
 Kho (cooking technique)

References

Vietnamese cuisine
Stews
Salted foods
Beef dishes